X. roseum may refer to:
 Xanthosoma roseum, an ornamental plant in the genus Xanthosoma
 Xenophyllum roseum, a species of flowering plant found only in Ecuador

Synonyms
 Xiphosium roseum, a synonym for Eria rosea, a species of orchid

See also
 Roseum (disambiguation)